Greater Manchester is home to various companies which operate in the United Kingdom or further afield in Europe and around the world. The city has a highly diversified economy and is a centre for cultural industries, retail, transport, logistics, financial, legal and manufacturing sectors.

Many of these companies have a regional base (regional base for Greater Manchester, North West England or Northern England) in Manchester. A number of globally trading companies are based in Manchester including PZ Cussons, Co-operative Group, Umbro and Peel Group. International companies such as the Kellogg's, Adidas, Siemens have their UK headquarters in Manchester with various warehouse and manufacturing facilities across the Greater Manchester region.

List of companies

 Abbey Business Centres
 Britannia Hotels
 Co-operative Group
 Co-operative Bank 
 Co-operative Financial Services 
 Co-operative Insurance Society
 Fast Web Media
 ISOFT 
 JJB Sports
 LateRooms 
 Manchester Building Society 
 Marble Brewery
 Mayne Coaches 
 Texet Sales 
 United Utilities 
 Urban Splash

Companies with other bases of significant importance in Manchester and Greater Manchester
 Direct Line Quay Street, Manchester city centre
 Guardian Media Group Manchester city centre
 Heinz Wigan produce over two million cans of food every day including soup and baked beans
 Highways Agency City Tower, Manchester city centre
 RAC Breakdown Control Centre, Business Solutions; Aviva Motoring Centre of Excellence Stretford

See also

 Economy of Manchester
 Lists of companies

References

Companies
Greater Manchester